The University of Aosta Valley (UNIVDA) is a university located in Aosta and Saint-Christophe, Italy. It was founded in 2000.

See also 
 List of Italian universities
 Aosta Valley

External links
University of Aosta valley Website 

Universities in Italy
Educational institutions established in 2000
Universita della Valle d'Aosta
Buildings and structures in Aosta
Education in Aosta Valley
2000 establishments in Italy